Europipe I is a  natural gas pipeline from the North Sea to Continental Europe.

History
The feasibility study of the pipeline's project was conducted in 1990.  On 20 April 1993, an agreement between Norway and Germany was concluded on the construction of Europipe.  The pipeline was commissioned on 1 October 1995 and it cost 21.3 billion NOK.

Route
The pipeline runs from the Draupner E riser platform in the North Sea to a receiving terminal at Dornum in Germany. At Draupner E, it is connected with Zeepipe and Statpipe/Norpipe system.  From Dornum a  land line runs to the metering station in Emden.

Technical description

The pipeline is owned by Gassled partners and operated by Gassco. The technical service provider is Statoil.

See also

 Europipe II
 MIDAL
 Norpipe

References

External links
 Europipe I, Gassco website

Energy infrastructure completed in 1995
North Sea energy
Natural gas pipelines in Germany
Natural gas pipelines in Norway
Germany–Norway relations
Pipelines under the North Sea
1995 establishments in Norway
1995 establishments in Germany